Carmelite Monastery, Wolverhampton is a monastic house at Poplar Road, Penn Fields, Wolverhampton, in the West Midlands, England. It was founded in 1922 by sisters from the Most Holy Trinity Monastery of Notting Hill, London.

References

External links 
 Website

Monasteries in the West Midlands (county)
1922 establishments in England
20th-century Christian monasteries
Wolverhampton
Discalced Carmelite Order in the United Kingdom